Javier 'Javi' Martínez González (born 27 June 1987) is a Spanish footballer who plays as a goalkeeper.

Football career
Martínez was born in Tarancón, Province of Cuenca. During his career, spent mainly in the third division, he played for hometown's Albacete Balompié, AD Ceuta, UB Conquense, Real Oviedo and CD Quintanar del Rey. In the 2006–07 season the 19-year-old appeared in 13 Segunda División games for the first club, in an eventual sixth-place finish.

Martínez represented Spain at the 2007 FIFA U-20 World Cup.

References

External links
 
 

1987 births
Living people
Sportspeople from the Province of Cuenca
Spanish footballers
Footballers from Castilla–La Mancha
Association football goalkeepers
Segunda División players
Segunda División B players
Tercera División players
Atlético Albacete players
Albacete Balompié players
AD Ceuta footballers
UB Conquense footballers
Real Oviedo players
Spain youth international footballers